Paul Balsam (July 19, 1905 – December 22, 1972) was a justice of the New York State Supreme Court from January 1, 1965, until his death in 1972.  He was born, and lived throughout his life, in Ozone Park, Queens.  After graduating from the Brooklyn Law School in 1928 and working for several law firms as an attorney, Balsam held several positions for New York State and City, including Assistant Attorney General (a position he held for seven years), Assistant District Attorney for Queens County (beginning in 1943), and Queens County Tax Commissioner.

From 1947, when Mayor William O'Dwyer appointed him as a City Magistrate, until his death, Judge Balsam served on the bench of several courts, including the Family Court for over ten years, and, as noted above, the New York State Supreme Court for eight years.  In 1968, Justice Balsam presided at the trial in which Herman B. Ferguson and Arthur Harris were convicted of conspiring to murder civil rights leader Whitney M. Young, Jr., as part of what was described as a "black revolutionary plot."

Balsam was active in numerous charitable organizations, including the Ozone Park Jewish Center and the Queens Jewish Center.  He was the son of Isaac and Sarah (Eisig) Balsam, and married Caroline Sager (November 13, 1908 - September 17, 2005) in 1931.  They had two children, Joel and Alan, an attorney and a physician, respectively, and nine grandchildren.

References

1905 births
1972 deaths
New York Supreme Court Justices
Brooklyn Law School alumni
20th-century American judges
People from Ozone Park, Queens